The following is a list of National Natural Landmarks in Montana.  There are 10 in total.

Montana
National Natural Landmarks